VA-204 may refer to:

 VFC-204, a squadron of the U.S. Navy, former designation VA-204
 Virginia State Route 204, a highway in the U.S. state of Virginia